The Speaker of the Palestinian Legislative Council is the chairman of the Palestinian Legislative Council of the Palestinian Authority. As Chairman, the Speaker acts as interim President of the Palestinian National Authority if the latter is unable to perform his or her duties. Under Palestinian law, the interim President holds the role for sixty days until an election is held.

Since 29 March 2006, the Speaker has been Aziz Dweik, of Hamas, though the Palestinian Legislative Council has not met since 2007.

History 
After the resignation of Palestinian Prime Minister, Mahmoud Abbas, on 6 September 2003, the Speaker of the Palestinian Legislative Council, Ahmed Qurei became acting Prime Minister, and he would be Prime Minister until 26 January 2006.

Rawhi Fattouh became interim President of the Palestinian Authority following the death of Yasser Arafat on 11 November 2004 until 15 January 2005, when Mahmoud Abbas was sworn in as President following the election.

List

See also
Chairman of the Palestine Liberation Organization
President of the State of Palestine
President of the Palestinian National Authority
Prime Minister of the Palestinian National Authority
Leaders of Palestinian institutions

References

1996 establishments in the Palestinian territories